This is a list in alphabetical order of cricketers who have played for Burgher Recreation Club in first-class matches. Where there is an article, the link comes before the club career span, and the scorecard name (typically initials and surname) comes after. If no article is present, the scorecard name comes before the span.

A
 M. W. Y. P. Abeykoon (2009–10)
 Thamara Abeyratne (2005–06 to 2011–12) : W. T. Abeyratne
 R. S. Abeysekera (1985–86)
 D. Achilles (1970–71)
 T. M. F. Ahamath (1989 to 1989–90)
 P. Aluthge (2013–14 to 2015–16)
 B. Amaradasa (1967–68)
 Ishara Amerasinghe (1997–98) : M. K. D. I. Amerasinghe
 N. N. Amerasinghe (1988–89 to 1994–95)
 S. Arangalla (1999–00)
 Chandana Aravinda (2003–04) : S. D. C. Aravinda
 Duncan Arnolda (1996–97 to 2007–08) : D. F. Arnolda
 V. Ashan (2014–15 to 2015–16)
 Mohamed Askar (2009–10 to 2013–14) : M. A. M. Asker
 Chathura Athukorala (2009–10) : A. A. C. E. Athukorala
 A. Athukorale (1988–89)

J
 A. P. Jansze (2008–09)
 D. M. Jayalath (2022 to 2022–23)
 P. S. Jayaprakashdaran (2012–13)
 C. U. Jayasinghe (1996–97 to 2004–05)
 Malinda Abhishek (2019–20 to 2020–21) : M. A. W. Jayasooriya
 P. Jayasooriya (2013–14)
 S. Jayasundera (1996–97)
 P. Jayasuriya (2013–14)
 S. P. W. Jayasuriya (1985–86 to 1998–99)
 K. Jayatilleke (1980–81)
 R. J. Jaymon (1992–93 to 1994–95)
 M. Jebarajah (1970–71)

References

Burgher Recreation Club